Rademan is a surname. Notable people with the surname include:

Lefébre Rademan (born 1996), South African netball player
Simon Rademan (born 1964), South African fashion designer and stylist

See also
Rademann